Héctor Casimiro Yazalde (29 May 1946 – 18 June 1997) was an Argentine professional footballer who played as a striker.

Nicknamed Chirola, Yazalde scored 46 goals in one single season with Sporting CP, being awarded that season's European Golden Shoe.

Club career
Born in Avellaneda, Buenos Aires Province, Yazalde's beginnings in football were fortuitous: he was visiting a friend who played with Club Atlético Piraña, an amateur club in the Argentine capital. He asked to join the training session, immediately causing a stirring impression and signing the very day; from there, he moved to Club Atlético Independiente, going on to help the team win two Primera División championships.

Yazalde signed with Sporting CP ahead of the 1971–72 season, helping the Lisbon side to the 1974 Primeira Liga by scoring 46 goals in just 29 games, both a domestic and European record. The following campaign, with the Lions finishing third, he netted 30 times, league's best and Europe's second.

As a prize for the European Golden Shoe, Yazalde received a Toyota car which he sold, then sharing the money with his teammates. After his Portuguese spell, he successively represented Olympique de Marseille, Newell's Old Boys and Club Atlético Huracán, retiring in 1981 and becoming a player's agent in his country.

International career
Yazalde earned ten caps for Argentina, appearing at the 1974 FIFA World Cup where he scored twice in three matches (both against Haiti, 4–1 win).

Personal life
Yazalde married Portuguese model/actress Maria do Carmo de Deus on 16 July 1973. In addition to modeling, Carmen – as he referred to her in Spanish, which stuck – had a brief career in acting in European cult films under the name Britt Nichols, but rarely spoke about this stage of her life since marrying the player.

Carmen came with him to Argentina to settle down, but the couple separated 14 years later though they never got legally divorced. They had one son, Gonçalo.

Death
Yazalde died in Buenos Aires on 18 June 1997, from hemorrhage and heart failure. He was aged 51.

Honours
Independiente
Argentine Primera División: 1967–68, 1969–70

Sporting CP
Primeira Liga: 1973–74
Taça de Portugal: 1972–73, 1973–74

Marseille
Coupe de France: 1975–76

Individual
Argentine Footballer of the Year: 1970
Primeira Liga top scorer: 1973–74, 1974–75
European Golden Boot: 1974

References

External links

 

1946 births
1997 deaths
Sportspeople from Avellaneda
Argentine footballers
Association football forwards
Argentine Primera División players
Club Atlético Independiente footballers
Newell's Old Boys footballers
Club Atlético Huracán footballers
Primeira Liga players
Sporting CP footballers
Ligue 1 players
Olympique de Marseille players
Argentina international footballers
1974 FIFA World Cup players
Argentine expatriate footballers
Expatriate footballers in France
Expatriate footballers in Portugal
Argentine expatriate sportspeople in France
Argentine expatriate sportspeople in Portugal
Argentine football managers
Club Atlético Huracán managers
Burials at La Chacarita Cemetery